Robert Bacon is a retired educator and Democratic politician from Fort Collins, Colorado. Bacon served as a Democratic member of the Colorado Senate, representing the 14th district from 2005 to 2013. Bacon also served in the Colorado State House from 1997 to 2003. Prior to that, he was elected twice to the Poudre School District Board of Education, serving from 1991 to 1999. Bacon Elementary School is named in his honor.

Biography 

Born in Galesburg, Illinois, Bacon earned a B.S. in Social Sciences at Illinois State University in 1957, and taught high school in Illinois before moving to Fort Collins, Colorado, in 1959. He received a Master's degree in History from University of Northern Colorado in 1961 while teaching in Poudre School District, where he remained until 1991, when he took a post at Front Range Community College for four years and then retiring. With his wife Beverly, Bacon has three grown children. In southeast Fort Collins, he was honored with the naming of Bacon Elementary School.

Bob Bacon was a teacher from 1957 to 1996.

Political history

Bacon was a director and board member for Poudre School District Board of Education from 1991 to 1999.

After retiring from the Poudre School District, Bacon was twice elected as a director to the Poudre School District Board of Education, serving from 1991 to 1999. He was then elected to the State House 53rd District in 1996, where he represented western Fort Collins, and rose to the post of Assistant Minority Leader.

Bacon was elected to his first term in the State Senate in 2004, defeating Republican Ray Martinez, a former Fort Collins mayor, and Libertarian Mark Brophy.  In 2008, Bacon defeated Republican Matt Fries to win reelection.

Bob Bacon has had the following political experience:

Senator, Colorado State Senate, 2004–2012
Assistant Minority Leader, Colorado State House of Representatives, 1999-2000
Representative, Colorado State House of Representatives, 1997-2004
Director/Board Member, Poudre School District Board of Education, 1991-1999

Senate committee assignments

2011-2012 

In the 2011-2012 legislative session, Bacon served on these committees:
 Appropriations Committee, Colorado State Senate
 Capital Development Committee, Colorado General Assembly, Vice Chair
 Education Committee, Colorado State Senate, Chair
 State, Veterans, and Military Affairs Committee, Colorado State Senate, Vice Chair

2009-2010 
 In the 2009-2010 legislative session, Bacon served on these committees:
 Appropriations Committee, Colorado Senate
 Education Committee, Colorado Senate
 State, Veterans & Military Affairs Committee, Colorado Senate

References

External links

 Senator Bob Bacon official website
 State Senator Bob Bacon official government site
Follow the Money - Bob Bacon
2006 2004 Senate campaign contributions
2002 2000 1998 1996 House campaign contributions

Democratic Party Colorado state senators
Democratic Party members of the Colorado House of Representatives
1935 births
Living people
Politicians from Fort Collins, Colorado
University of Northern Colorado alumni
Illinois State University alumni
21st-century American politicians
School board members in Colorado